Jeronimo Šarin (born February 28, 1974) is a Croatian professional basketball coach and former player. He currently serves as the head coach for the Furnir of the Croatian League.

References

Croatian basketball coaches
Croatian men's basketball players
Basketball players from Šibenik
1974 births
Living people
KK Dubrava coaches
KK Šibenik players
KK Zagreb players
Unia Tarnów basketball players
Limburg United players
BSC Fürstenfeld Panthers players
PVSK Panthers players
Olympique Antibes basketball players
KB Prishtina coaches